Modern American School (MAS) is a private, co-educational day school in , Coyoacán, Mexico City. It serves kindergarten and preschool through senior year of high school. The Modern American School ranked 3rd out of more than 50 private schools in the 2020 Reforma Mexico City High School rankings.

The school was established in 1952 by teacher María Vilchis Barroso de Rodríguez and her husband Javier Rodríguez Rodríguez.  Since its foundation MAS has been a co-ed, non-religious and bilingual (English and Spanish) institution.

The school's goal is to give students an education that promotes the development of their intellectual, emotional, physical, artistical, and ethical capacities. The Modern American School aims to create a workplace of honesty, cooperation and excellence that allows its students to succeed in an ever-more-competitive world.

Notable alumni 
Nora Volkov (born 1956), director of the US National Institute on Drug Abuse.
Arturo Sarukhán Casamitjana (born 1963), former Ambassador of Mexico to the United States.
Pablo Kuri-Morales (born 1961), former Deputy Secretary of Health.
Monica Lavín (born 1955), award-winning author and journalist.
Alfredo Rimoch (born 1954), CEO at Liomont Laboratories.

References

External links
 Modern American School
  Modern American School

High schools in Mexico City